The 3HP 22 is a three-speed automatic transmission from ZF Friedrichshafen AG for passenger cars. Introduced in 1973, it was produced through 1990, and has been used in a variety of cars from Alfa Romeo, BMW, Citroën, Peugeot, and Fiat.

Specifications

Torque

Weight
Weight: 45 kg gearbox with converter

Control
Control: mechanical / hydraulic

Technical data

See also
list of ZF transmissions

References

3HP 22